Paul Francis Edwards (born 7 October 1947) is an English former footballer who played as a defender for Manchester United, Oldham Athletic and Stockport County.

Born in Shaw and Crompton, Lancashire, Edwards began his football career with Manchester United, signing his first amateur contract with them on 14 August 1963. He turned professional 18 months later, but it was not for another four years that he made his first team debut, playing in the 3–0 defeat away to Everton on 19 August 1969. His first – and only – goal for the club came in the December of that year. In a League Cup semi-final against Manchester City on 17 December 1969, Edwards let fly with a long-range effort that flew past the City goalkeeper. It proved to be the highlight of Edwards' Manchester United career. In his first full season with the club, Edwards made 28 appearances for Manchester United, but a run of bad form halfway through his second season resulted in a short period in the reserves. Up to that point, Edwards had mainly been deployed as a right-back, but when he returned to the first team, he was played at centre-back.

Frank O'Farrell took over as manager of Manchester United in June 1971, and Edwards fell out of favour in the new manager's team selections. He remained at the club for two further seasons, but he found first team opportunities hard to come by and he was loaned to Oldham Athletic for six months in September 1972 before they signed him for £15,000 in the summer of 1973. The following season, Edwards helped the Latics to their second Third Division title. He stayed with them until 1978, 112 appearances and seven goals later, when he moved to Stockport County, with whom he had spent a short period on loan in 1976–77. After 67 appearances and two goals for Stockport, Edwards retired from professional football.

External links
Profile at StretfordEnd.co.uk
Profile at redStat

1947 births
Living people
People from Shaw and Crompton
English footballers
England under-23 international footballers
Footballers from Oldham
Association football defenders
English Football League players
Manchester United F.C. players
Oldham Athletic A.F.C. players
Stockport County F.C. players
English Football League representative players